Jet Deck (1960–1971) was a Quarter Horse racehorse and sire.

Life

Foaled April 19, 1960 in California, Jet Deck was the offspring of Moon Deck and a daughter of Barred named Miss Night Bar. Miss Night Bar was a granddaughter of Three Bars (TB).

Racing career 
Jet Deck was a multiple stakes winner and was named by the American Quarter Horse Association (or AQHA) the 1962 Champion Quarter Running Two Year Old Colt and Stallion, as well as the 1963 World Champion Quarter Running Horse. He raced for two years, with thirty-one starts. He won twenty-two of his starts, four times coming in second and placing third twice. He earned forty-two AQHA racing points to go with his money earnings of $200,625.00. His highest speed rating was AAAT.

Breeding record and death 
After Jet Deck's racing career, he was retired to stud duties, but died on August 26, 1971 from an injection of barbiturates into his bloodstream. The identity of the person who injected him has never been determined. Before his death, he sired 383 race Register of Merit earning horses, several world champion Quarter running horses, two AQHA High Point horses, and five AQHA Champions. Among his offspring are Easy Jet, Jet Smooth, Jet Threat, and Mr Jet West.

Honors 
Jet Deck was inducted into the AQHA Hall of Fame in 1991.

Pedigree

Notes

References

 All Breed Pedigree Database Pedigree of Jet Deck retrieved on June 23, 2007
 AQHA Hall of Fame accessed on September 1, 2017

External links
 Jet Deck at Quarter Horse Directory
 Jet Deck at Quarter Horse Legends

Racehorses bred in California
Racehorses trained in the United States
American Quarter Horse racehorses
American Quarter Horse sires
1960 racehorse births
1971 racehorse deaths
AQHA Hall of Fame (horses)